Pfeiffer is a German-language occupational surname meaning "whistler" or "pipe-" or "fife-player" and etymologically akin to English Piper and Fifer; other spellings include Pfeifer. Notable people with the name include:

Arts 
 Alberta Pfeiffer (1899–1994), Illinois architect
 Carl Pfeiffer (architect) (1834–1888), German-born NYC architect
 Darrin Pfeiffer (born 1969), American musician
 Dedee Pfeiffer (born 1964), American actress
 Emil Pfeiffer (1846–1921), German physician
 Emily Jane Pfeiffer (1827–1890), Welsh poet, philanthropist
 Franz Pfeiffer (1815–1868), German literary scholar
 Georges Pfeiffer (1835–1908), French composer
 Ida Laura Pfeiffer (1797–1858), Austrian traveller and travel book author
 Johann Pfeiffer (1697–1791), German violinist and composer
 Michelle Pfeiffer (born 1958), American actress
 Paul Pfeiffer (artist) (born 1966), American video artist
 Pauline Pfeiffer (1895–1951), American journalist and second wife of Ernest Hemingway

Military 
 Hermann Pfeiffer, German aviator and flying ace

Politics and government 
 Alois Pfeiffer (1924–1987), German trade unionist who served as a European Commissioner in the 1980s
 Burkhard Wilhelm Pfeiffer (1777-1852), German jurist, magistrate, and liberal politician
 Franz Georg Pfeiffer (1784-1856), German civil servant and legal scholar
 Harry H. Pfeiffer (died 1970), American politician
 Joachim Pfeiffer (born 1967), German politician (CDU)

Sciences 
 Carl Pfeiffer (pharmacologist) (1908–88), one of the founders of orthomolecular psychiatry
 Carl Jonas Pfeiffer (1779-1836), German conchologist and banker
 Ehrenfried Pfeiffer (1891–1961), biochemist active in the development of biodynamic agriculture
 Emil Pfeiffer (1846-1921), German physician and pediatrician
 George Adam Pfeiffer (1889–1943), American mathematician
 Georgii Yurii Pfeiffer (1872–1946), Ukrainian mathematician
 Louis Pfeiffer (1805–77), German physician, botanist and conchologist
 Paul Pfeiffer (chemist) (1875–1951), German chemist
 Richard Friedrich Johannes Pfeiffer, (1858–1945), German physician and bacteriologist
 Rudolf Arthur Pfeiffer, German geneticist
 Paul Pfeiffer (biopharmacist) (1972), American CEO and salesman

Sports 
 Darren Pfeiffer (born 1987), Australian football player

Fictional characters
 Hans Pfeiffer, a character from the novel Die Feuerzangenbowle

See also
 Pfeiffer (disambiguation)
 Halley Feiffer, American actress and playwright
 Jules Feiffer, American cartoonist
 Yann Peifer, German trance musician better known as "Yanou"
 Pfeifer, a surname
 Pfeffer, a surname
 Pfeiffer House (disambiguation)
 William T. Pheiffer (1898–1986), American lawyer, Republican politician and diplomat
 Willem Pijper, Dutch composer, music critic and music teacher

References

German-language surnames
Jewish surnames